Guiltcross Rural District was a rural district in Norfolk, England from 1894 to 1902.

It was formed under the Local Government Act 1894 based on the Guiltcross rural sanitary district. It lay in the southern part of the county between Thetford and Diss and took its name from the ancient Guiltcross hundred.

In 1902, Guiltcross RD was abolished and its territory divided between Thetford, Wayland and Depwade RDs.

Parishes & Statistics

Population figures from 1901 census via Vision of Britain.

References

Districts of England created by the Local Government Act 1894
Historical districts of Norfolk
Rural districts of England